Kenneth Richard Block (born March 18, 1944) is a Canadian former professional ice hockey defenseman who played 455 games in the World Hockey Association (WHA) and one game in the National Hockey League (NHL).

Early life
Block was born in Steinbach, Manitoba, and played junior hockey with the Flin Flon Bombers.

Career 
Block turned pro in 1964 and spent three seasons in the New York Rangers farm system before being selected by the Los Angeles Kings in the 1967 NHL Expansion Draft. Two days after the draft, he was traded to the Toronto Maple Leafs for the rights to Hall of Famer Red Kelly, who had retired as a player but accepted a job coaching the Kings. Opportunities to break into a deep Toronto squad were slim, and Block spent the next five seasons toiling for the Rochester Americans of the American Hockey League, where he played on the same blueline with and was later coached by Don Cherry.

In 1970, the owners of the WHL Vancouver Canucks were granted an NHL expansion franchise of the same name. Since the Canucks still owned his WHL rights from a stint there several years prior, his NHL rights were transferred to Vancouver. In 1970–71, Vancouver's inaugural season, Block played one NHL game.

Block moved to the upstart World Hockey Association (WHA) in 1972, joining the New York Raiders. During his first season in the WHA, he recorded five goals and 53 assists for 58 points, good for third among WHA defenders in assists and sixth in points. He had another strong season in 1973–74, recording three goals and 43 assists for 46 points. The franchise moved to New Jersey and then to San Diego for the 1974–75 season.

Midway through the 1974–75 campaign, Block was dealt to the Indianapolis Racers, where he played his final five seasons before retiring in 1979. In his last season, he played briefly with Wayne Gretzky before Gretzky was dealt to the Edmonton Oilers. Upon the dissolution of the WHA in 1979 and merger with the NHL, Block was one of the few players to stay in the WHA throughout its existence.

He finished his WHA career 13th all time in games played.

Career statistics

Regular season and playoffs

See also
List of players who played only one game in the NHL

External links

1944 births
Living people
Baltimore Clippers players
Canadian expatriate ice hockey players in the United States
Canadian ice hockey defencemen
Flin Flon Bombers players
Ice hockey people from Manitoba
Indianapolis Racers players
Memphis South Stars players
Minnesota Rangers players
Jersey Knights players
New York Golden Blades players
New York Raiders players
New York Rovers players
Omaha Knights (CHL) players
Rochester Americans players
San Diego Mariners players
Sportspeople from Steinbach, Manitoba
Vancouver Canucks players
Vancouver Canucks (WHL) players